Melasemmangudi is a village in the Papanasam taluk of Thanjavur district, Tamil Nadu, India.

Demographics 

As per the 2001 census, Melasemmangudi had a total population of 914 with 461 males and 453 females. The sex ratio was 983. The literacy rate was 59.34.

References 

 

Villages in Thanjavur district